Superior Bank may refer to:
 Superior Bancorp - a bank holding company that suffered from bank failure in 2011
 Superior Bank of Chicago